Vishwanath Pratap Singh  was sworn in as Prime Minister of India on 2 December 1989. His initial ministry consisted of the following Cabinet ministers and their departments. The Cabinet was functional from the 2 December 1989 to 10 November 1990.

Cabinet ministers

Ministers of State
 Mufti Mohammed Sayeed - Minister of State for Home Affairs
 Chaudhary Devi Lal - Minister of State for Agriculture
 Maneka Gandhi - Minister of State for Environment & Forests
 Dr Raja Ramanna - Minister of State for Defence
 Prof M. G. K. Menon - Minister of State for Science and Technology
 Ram Pujan Patel - Minister of State for Food and Civil Supplies
 Manubhai Kotadia - Minister of State (Independent Charge) for Water Resources
 Satya Pal Malik - Minister of State for Parliamentary Affairs and Tourism

References

External links

Indian union ministries
1989 establishments in India
V. P. Singh administration
1990 disestablishments in India
Cabinets established in 1989
Cabinets disestablished in 1990
Janata Dal
Telugu Desam Party
Asom Gana Parishad
Dravida Munnetra Kazhagam